Baron Aberconway, of Bodnant in the County of Denbigh, is a title in the Peerage of the United Kingdom. It was created on 21 June 1911 for the industrialist and Liberal politician Sir Charles McLaren, 1st Baronet.  He had already been created a baronet, of Bodnant, Gwylgre and Hilders, on 24 July 1902.

His eldest son, the second Baron, was a businessman and also sat as a Member of Parliament.  He was succeeded by his son, the third Baron.  In August 1939, the future third Baron was part of a secret delegation sent to Germany by Lord Halifax to offer Adolf Hitler concessions on the assurance that he would not invade Poland. Since 2003, the title passed to his eldest son, the fourth Baron. 

, the present holder of the barony has not successfully proven his succession to the baronetcy and is therefore not on the Official Roll of the Baronetage.  However, the case is under review by the Registrar of the Baronetage.
For more information, follow this link.

Aberconway is the anglicised form of the Welsh place name Aberconwy, the original name of Conwy town in Welsh.

The family seat is Bodnant House, near Tal-y-Cafn, Conwy, Wales. The traditional burial place of the Lords Aberconway is a mausoleum called "The Poem" within Bodnant Garden.

Barons Aberconway (1911)
 Charles Benjamin Bright McLaren, 1st Baron Aberconway (1850–1934)
 Henry Duncan McLaren, 2nd Baron Aberconway (1879–1953)
 Charles Melville McLaren, 3rd Baron Aberconway (1913–2003)
 Henry Charles McLaren, 4th Baron Aberconway (born 1948)

The heir apparent is the present holder's son, Charles Stephen McLaren (born 1984).

References

Baronies in the Peerage of the United Kingdom
Noble titles created in 1911
Noble titles created for UK MPs
McLaren family